Athena Eva Su McNinch (born December 28, 1997) is a Guamanian-Taiwanese beauty pageant titleholder who was Miss Universe Guam 2018, and represented Guam at the Miss International 2019 in Tokyo, Japan.

Early life and education 
Athena has lived her entire life in Mangilao, Guam, the village where the University of Guam is located. Her mother is from Kaohsiung, Taiwan and is Chinese-Polynesian. Her father is Irish, Norwegian and English. In high school, Athena worked as a camp aide for 5-7 year olds at the University of Guam Summer Camp. Miss Guam Ambassador for the Guam Visitor's Bureau. She is currently a graduate teaching assistant for former Governor Ansito Walter at the University of Guam. Athena speaks English and Mandarin Chinese.

In 2017, she was named a Harry S. Truman Scholar, followed by earning the US Congressional Award Gold Medal in 2018. Athena is an active member of the Alpha Phi Sigma, Blue Key Honors Society, and Golden Key International Honors Society.

Pageantry 
Athena was named to serve as the Guam representative to the Miss International pageant in April 2019. this event will be held in Tokyo, Japan in November 2019. Athena was crowned the Miss Universe Guam 2018 by 2017 Miss Universe Guam, Myana Welch, at the Guam Sheraton. She represented Guam in Bangkok, Thailand in December 2018. In the 2018 Miss Universe Guam Pageant, Athena was named best in evening gown and best in swimsuit. In 2015, Athena was named First Runner Up and Miss Photogenic in the Miss World Guam Pageant.

References

External links 

Living people
1997 births
Miss Guam winners
Miss Universe 2018 contestants
Guamanian people of Chinese descent
Guamanian people of English descent
Guamanian people of Norwegian descent
Guamanian people of Irish descent
Miss International 2019 delegates
University of Guam alumni